Qinglong Subdistrict is a subdistrict situated in northern Anning City, Yunnan province, southwestern China. It lies about 60 km west of Kunming, situated on the east bank of the Tanglang River. Formerly a town, its status changed to a subdistrict of Anning in 2011.

References

Anning, Yunnan
Township-level divisions of Kunming